Fragmented is the debut album from the Filipino independent band Up Dharma Down.

Track listing

Personnel
Armi Millare - keyboards, vocals
Carlos Tañada - lead guitars
Ean Mayor - drums and loops
Paul Yap - bass

Credits
 caliph8 - Turntables on "June"
 Paolo Garcia - "Oo" (Fragmented version)
 Everywhere We Shoot!  - Photography & Design
 Ramon Vizmonte  - Website programming

2006 albums
Up Dharma Down albums